THE NOVEMBERS is a four-piece Japanese alternative rock band.  A preceding band was first formed in 2002 by Kobayashi Yusuke and Takamatsu Hirofumi. Subsequently, the preceding band disbanded in 2005, and "The Novembers" was officially formed in March 2005 with Kobayashi and Takamatsu joined first by drummer Yoshiki Ryousuke in August 2005, before its current lineup solidified in October 2005 with the arrival of Matsumoto Kengo.
 

The band released two demo albums in 2006 before making its indie debut on UK Project's Daizawa Record with the release of their album, The Novembers in November, 2007.

They launched their independent label MERZ in October 2013 and also played a variety of Japanese festivals, such as appearing at the Red Marquee stage at the Fuji Rock Festival in 2014.

In October 2015 they joined forces with a renowned producer Masami Tsuchiya (Blankey Jet City, GLAY) and released their fifth EP, Elegance. The band celebrated their 11th anniversary (its significance highlighted by their namesake) by inviting an array of guests such as Boris, Klan Aileen, MONO, Roth Bart Baron, Art-School, Burgh, acid android, Takkyu Ishino, and The Birthday to their self-produced event series named “KUBI”, as well as releasing their sixth album, Hallelujah, becoming the first Japanese artist to release on the MAGNIPH / Hostess joint label. The subsequent album release tour culminated in 11th anniversary show on November 11 at Shinkiba STUDIO COAST in Tokyo. The TODAY EP was released in May 2018 and their latest album, ANGELS, arrived in March 2019.

They have also supported numerous international bands, including RIDE, Television, No Age, Mystery Jets, Wild Nothing, Thee Oh Sees, Dot Hacker, Astrobright and Yuck.

Band members
Yūsuke Kobayashi (小林祐介, born December 18, 1985) – vocals, guitar, keyboards - also vocalist in DECAYS and The Spellbound with Masayuki Nakano of Boom Boom Satellites
Kengo Matsumoto (ケンゴマツモト, born June 1983) – guitar, keyboards
Hirofumi Takamatsu (高松浩史, born November 19, 1985) – bass - also bassist in Petit Brabancon with Kyo, Yukihiro, Miya, and antz (Tokyo Shoegazer).
Ryousuke Yoshiki (吉木諒祐, born November 1, 1985) – drums

Discography

Studio albums

EPs

Singles

Demos

DVDs

Compilations appearances

Music videos

Official music videos

References

External links
Official website
Weblog
Official Myspace

Japanese indie rock groups
Japanese alternative rock groups
Shoegazing musical groups
Musical quartets
Musical groups established in 2005